Claude Darciaux (born 18 October 1942) was a member of the National Assembly of France.  She represented Côte-d'Or's 3rd constituency, from 1997 to 2012 as a member of the Socialiste, radical, citoyen et divers gauche.

References

1942 births
Living people
Politicians from Besançon
Socialist Party (France) politicians
Deputies of the 12th National Assembly of the French Fifth Republic
Deputies of the 13th National Assembly of the French Fifth Republic